Shir Kosh-e Sofla (also Romanized as Shīr Kosh-e Soflá; also known as Sarkosh-e Pā’īn, Sarkūsh-e Pā’īn, and Sarkush Pāin) is a village in Najafabad Rural District, in the Central District of Bijar County, Kurdistan Province, Iran. At the 2006 census, its population was 173, in 31 families. The village is populated by Kurds.

References 

Towns and villages in Bijar County
Kurdish settlements in Kurdistan Province